Beta Serpentis, Latinized from β Serpentis, is a binary star system in the constellation Serpens, in its head (Serpens Caput). It is visible to the naked eye with a combined apparent visual magnitude of +3.65. Based upon an annual parallax shift of 21.03 mas as seen from Earth, it is located around 155 light years from the Sun. The system is a member of the Ursa Major Moving Group.

Components
The visual magnitude +3.68 primary, component  A, is either an ordinary A-type main-sequence star or somewhat evolved subgiant with a stellar classification of A2 V or A2 IV, respectively. The star is about 267 million years old with nearly double the mass of the Sun. It is spinning rapidly with a projected rotational velocity of 207 km/s.

The secondary component, visual magnitude 9.7 B, lies at an angular separation of 30.6 arc seconds. It is a main-sequence star with a class of K3 V.

There is a magnitude +10.98 visual companion, designated component C, located 202 arcseconds away.

Nomenclature
It was a member of indigenous Arabic asterism al-Nasaq al-Sha'āmī, "the Northern Line" of al-Nasaqān "the Two Lines", along with β Her (Kornephoros), γ Her (Hejian, Ho Keen) and γ Ser (Zheng, Ching).

According to the catalogue of stars in the Technical Memorandum 33-507 - A Reduced Star Catalog Containing 537 Named Stars, al-Nasaq al-Sha'āmī or Nasak Shamiya were the title for three stars :β Ser as Nasak Shamiya I, γ Ser as Nasak Shamiya II, γ Her as Nasak Shamiya III (exclude β Her).

References

A-type main-sequence stars
A-type subgiants
K-type main-sequence stars
Binary stars
Ursa Major Moving Group

Serpentis, Beta
Serpens (constellation)
BD+15 2911
Serpentis, 28
141003
077233
5867